Geltendorf is a municipality in the district of Landsberg in Bavaria, Germany.

World heritage site
It is home to one or more prehistoric pile-dwelling (or stilt house) settlements that are part of the Prehistoric Pile dwellings around the Alps UNESCO World Heritage Site.

Transport

References

External link

Landsberg (district)